The Chordials are a collegiate all-gender a cappella group from Cornell University in Ithaca, NY. They are known for their edgy and passionate style, and perform a broad variety of music genres ranging from rock to alternative/indie to pop.

History
The Cornell Chordials were founded in 1997 by a group of Cornell students, including founder Elana Wolff ('01), Music Director Dennis Chow ('99), President Anand Swaminathan ('99), and Business Manager Amanda Stahl ('99). The group has traveled and performed in many venues across the northeast, including at Penn State, Haverford, Rutgers, Muhlenberg, RPI, Johns Hopkins, Rochester, Buffalo, New York City, Martha's Vineyard, the Ithaca area, as well as many venues on the Cornell University campus.

Over the years, the Chordials have had anywhere from six to eighteen members. Every year since 1998 the group has produced at least one major concert, including their annual "Cocktail Hour" concert in the spring semester. Their original annual fall concert was titled "Crunkapella", but has since changed to "After Hours". Throughout their time at Cornell University, the Chordials have maintained a varied repertoire including such songs as Sam Sparro's "Black and Gold", Bon Iver's "8 (circle)", Fleetwood Mac's "The Chain" and Rihanna's "What Now".  Through their regional performances and their several album releases, the Chordials have become a well-known exemplar of the collegiate a cappella genre.

The group produced their first album Shaken... Not Stirred in the spring of 1999. The album features songs such as "Come on Eileen" and "Killing Me Softly." The group's second album Not For Minors premiered in the fall of 2002, with songs including Sarah McLachlan's song "Angel" and Madonna's "Like a Prayer", which is now the Chordials' official alumni song. Their third album, The Third Chapter, features renditions of "Echo" by Incubus, Gladys Knight's "I Heard It Through the Grapevine", and "One Sweet Day" as recorded by Boyz II Men and Mariah Carey.

In 2001, the group made its debut at the ICCA (International Championship of College A Cappella) quarterfinals in Rochester, NY, during which member Gabi Kornfeld ('04) received the award for Best Vocalist for her performance of "Angel." In subsequent years, the group received additional awards at the ICCA including Best Choreography, Best Soloist, Best Arrangement, and Best Percussion. In 2004, the Chordials became ICCA Finalists, placing third at the ICCA Finals in New York City's Town Hall Theater (ICCA Website).

The group's fourth album, Arrival, was released on April 14, 2007 at their tenth anniversary concert "Cocktail Hour X". It was recorded and produced by alumnus James Cannon ('07), via his production company "The Panic Room." Arrival features complex arrangements of songs from the catalogs of artists such as Puddle of Mudd, Snow Patrol, Nine Inch Nails, and others. At the concert, the Chordials celebrated their first-ever appearance on the annual Best of College A Cappella (BOCA) album for their rendition of Nickelback's "Photograph". Arrival also went on to win the 2007 acaTunes Award for their cover of "Let Me Entertain You," featuring soloist Rebecca Urbelis ('08). The album became a Recorded A Cappella Review Board (RARB) Pick of the Year in 2007.

In 2008, the Chordials were nominated for the Contemporary A Cappella Recording Awards (CARAs) for the first time in their history. Arrival was nominated for all four awards in the Mixed Collegiate categories, including Best Song (nominated), Best Soloist (runner-up), Best Arrangement (winner), and Best Album (winner).

In December 2006 and 2007, the Chordials embarked on a week-long "Winter Tour" across the southern regions of New York State and northern New Jersey, focusing on giving performances and educational musical workshops at high schools across the region. In March 2009, The Chordials toured the southern regions of New York State yet again, as well as parts of western Connecticut.

In 2008, the Chordials released their fifth studio album, titled Smash, produced by alumni James Cannon ('07) and Ari Goldman ('09). This album, like Arrival, was nominated for all eligible categories in the  Contemporary A Cappella Recording Awards (CARAs), and the album was also chosen as a Recorded A Cappella Review Board (RARB) Pick of the Year. The City Is At War, originally performed by Cobra Starship was featured on the Best of College A Cappella CD in 2009.

The Chordials went on their first international tour in June 2008. It was a sponsored trip around Germany in support of The Foundation for Women's Health, Research and Development, an organization which focuses on the prevention of female genital mutilation. The group performed over a ten-day period throughout Germany at private events, schools, castles, and in the streets of Frankfurt.

Over the summer of 2010, the Chordials traveled to Martha's Vineyard for a four-day summer tour and retreat. The group performed at the West Chop Club.

Shake The Poet, the Chordials' first EP was released at their Fall concert, "Crunkapella" on November 14, 2009. This first half of this EP was recorded and edited by alumnus James Cannon ('07) with the remainder being recorded by Steven Goldman of "Four Legs Records." Five of the six EP songs were mixed by Goldman, while the mixing of "Ramalama (Bang Bang)" was handled by alumnus James Cannon. Since its release, the six track EP has won Best Mixed Collegiate Song, Best Mixed Collegiate Soloist, and it was the runner up for Best Mixed Collegiate Album in the Contemporary A Cappella Recording Awards (CARA). "Use Somebody" was featured as the opening track on the 2010 Best of College A Cappella (BOCA) Compilation CD. Shake the Poet was chosen as a CASA Top Ten Mixed Collegiate Album Pick of the Year, and their cover of Ramalama (Bang Bang) was chosen to be featured on Sing VII: Lucky.

Their seventh studio recording, PULSE, was released on April 29, 2011 at Cocktail Hour XIV.

In the Spring of 2013, after almost a decade, the group returned to the ICCA stage, earning 3rd place overall at ICCA Finals in New York City.

In the Summer of 2013, the Chordials released their eighth studio album, the Shadow Aspect.

Recent events

In February 2016, the Chordials released Surface. It was nominated for 3 CARA awards, winning Best Mixed Collegiate Solo and being the runner up for Best Mixed Collegiate Album. It is also featured on Voices Only 2016, Sing 13: SUPERSTITION, and is an RARB Pick of the Year.

On April 29, 2017, the Chordials celebrated their 20th anniversary at Cocktail Hour XX.

In the spring of 2018, the Chordials began the recordings for their EP, From Excavation. The EP  was released on November 17, 2018 at the eighth anniversary of their After Hours concert. The idea behind this EP was to bring their vision of a cappella back to the bare basics, and to produce recordings with minimal added effects so as to focus on the beauty of purely vocal music.

On June 22, 2020, the Chordials released their latest album, Fire & Concrete.

Awards

Albums

Shaken, Not Stirred (1999)
 One Fine Day
 She Has A Girlfriend Now
 That Lonesome Road
 Independent Love Song
 Return to Innocence
 In the Still of the Night
 Heaven
 Sweet Surrender
 Come on Eileen
 And So It Goes
 Come Go with Me
 Killing Me Softly
 Take On Me
 Trippin' Billies
 Dream

Not For Minors (2002)
 Spiderwebs
 The Lion Sleeps Tonight
 Like a Prayer
 Kate
 Landslide
 The Longest Time
 Black Balloon
 Linger
 Bed of Lies
 What a Feeling
 With Arms Wide Open
 Angel

The Third Chapter (2005)
 All For Leyna/I Just Died in Your Arms Tonight
 Bright Lights
 Echo
 Precious Things
 I Heard It Through the Grapevine
 Center of Attention
 I'll Be Okay
 Love You Madly
 One Sweet Day
 Alegria
 You And I Both
 Paper Bag
 Please Don't Go
 One By One/Circle of Life

Arrival (2007)

 Let Me Entertain You
 This Is How A Heart Breaks
 Blurry
 Breathe In
 Farther Away
 Chasing Cars
 Who Knew
 Waiting For You
 Perfect Drug
 Photograph
 Swing Low, Sweet Chariot

Smash (2008)
 Never Again
 The City Is at War
 Black and Gold
 Nothin' Better to Do
 Lithium
 The Bird and the Worm
 Die Alone
 Sweep the Leg
 Someone Else's Tomorrow
 Mercy on Me
 Love Me Dead
 The Moment I Said It

Shake the Poet (2009)
 Use Somebody
 Cold Shoulder
 God Put A Smile On Your Face
 Ramalama (Bang Bang)
 Decode
 Soon We'll Be Found

Pulse (2011)
 Sweet Disposition
 Sincerely, Jane
 The Other Side
 Touch
 What's a Girl Gotta Do
 Rolling in the Deep
 Smile for the Paparazzi
 Papa Was a Rollin' Stone
 Skipping Stone
 Pantomime
 Cosmic Love

Digital singles (2013)
 Lights
 Barton Hollow

The Shadow Aspect (2013)
 Lights
 Plain Gold Ring
 Save Me
 Lost in the World
 Face of Light
 Barton Hollow
 Bizness
 Lies
 Too Close
 My Kind of Love
 The Cave
 The Light
 Nothing But the Water

Surface (2016)
 Haunted
 Breath of Life
 Lovely Day
 Moving On
 Retrograde
 Choices
 Waters
 The Chain
 Trembling Hands
 You Know Where To Find Me
 It's About Time
 What Now

From Excavation (2018)

 8 (Circle)
 Bass Song
 Hideaway

Fire & Concrete (2020)

 Bass Song
 When the Party's Over
 I Warned Myself
 8 (Circle)
 Omens
 Commit Me
 Hideaway
 We Won't Run

See also
Cornell University
Collegiate a cappella

References

External links
Main website
YouTube channel

Collegiate a cappella groups
Musical groups established in 1997
Cornell University student organizations
1997 establishments in New York (state)